Lophopoenopsis is a genus of beetles in the family Cerambycidae, containing the following species:

 Lophopoenopsis albosparsus Monne & Monne, 2007
 Lophopoenopsis singularis Melzer, 1931

References

Acanthocinini